"Under the God" is the first official single released by Tin Machine, taken from their eponymous debut album in June 1989.

Song information
"Under the God", which came from a demo originally called "Night Train", was a song that excoriated Neo-Nazism.

Although "Heaven's in Here" was actually the album's first single, it was only released promotionally, which made "Under the God" the first official single, released after the album was already available.

Critical reception
Jerry Smith, reviewer of British music newspaper Music Week, reviewed the single positively, saying that it reminds him of Bowie's "Panic in Detroit" and expressed the assurance that it "should ignite the charts".

Music video
The band elected not to create music videos for the album's singles, and instead created a 13-track megamix video for the entire album. The video, directed by Julien Temple, presented edits of each song in vignette form, and included "Under the God" masqueraded as a performance, with the audience storming the stage.

Live performances
"Under the God" was performed live on both the 1989 Tin Machine Tour and 1991-92's It's My Life Tour. A live performance of the song, recorded in Sapporo, Japan in 1992, was included on the live album Tin Machine Live: Oy Vey, Baby (1992).

Track listing
7" version

 "Under the God" (Bowie) – 4:06
 "Sacrifice Yourself" (Bowie, Sales, Sales) – 2:08

10"/12"/CD version

 "Under the God" (Bowie) – 4:06
 "Sacrifice Yourself" (Bowie, Sales, Sales) – 2:08
 "The Interview" (An interview with the band) – 12:23

Credits and personnel
Producers
 Tin Machine
 Tim Palmer

Musicians
 David Bowie – lead vocals, rhythm guitar
 Reeves Gabrels – lead guitar
 Hunt Sales – drums, backing vocals
 Tony Sales – bass guitar, backing vocals

Chart performance

References

Notes
Pegg, Nicholas, The Complete David Bowie, Reynolds & Hearn Ltd, 2000,

External links
 

1989 singles
Tin Machine songs
Songs written by David Bowie
1989 songs
EMI Records singles
Music videos directed by Julien Temple